In a Different Light is Avalon's third studio album, released on March 23, 1999. It is the first album with group member Cherie Adams, who replaced Nikki Hassman-Anders. This is Avalon's second album to be certified Gold by the RIAA. The project was an instant hit at Christian radio, containing four No. 1 singles: "Can't Live A Day", "Take You At Your Word", "In Not Of", and "Always Have, Always Will". It debuted and peaked on the Billboard 200 chart at #81 for the week of April 10, 1999, spending a total of 13 weeks on that specific chart.

Track listing

Personnel
Credits adapted from In a Different Light liner notes.

Avalon – Vocals
Janna Long
Jody McBrayer
Cherie Paliotta
Michael Passons
Adam Anders – Bass (3, 10)
George Cocchini – Guitar (2, 5)
Eric Darken – Percussion (4, 5)
Scott Denté – Acoustic guitar (6–8)
Chris Eaton – Vocal arrangement (3, 5, 6)
Chris Harris – Vocal arrangement (1, 2)
Matt Huesmann – Additional keyboards (3)
Gordon Kennedy – Guitar (2-5, 8)
Kip Kubin – Programming (3, 7, 9)
Phil Madeira – Hammond B-3 (5, 8)
Carl Marsh – String arrangement (4, 8)
Blair Masters – Additional keyboards (4, 5)
Chris McHugh – Drums (2, 3, 5)
Jerry McPherson – Electric guitar (4-8, 11)
Michael Mellett – Vocal arrangement (4, 5, 7, 9–11)
Tony Miracle – Programming (1–11), guitar (1, 9)
The Nashville String Machine – Strings (4, 8)
Carl Gorodetzky – Conductor
Dan Needham – Drums (4)
Jimmie Lee Sloas – Bass (5)

Choir ("Only for the Weak"):
Stacie Vining
Curt Sanders
Matthew Barnes
Shelly Justice
Delores Cox
Stephanie Harrison
Chad Dickerson
Jennifer Thune
Steven Skeen
Grant Cunningham
Stacey Jennette
Greg Long

References

1999 albums
Avalon (band) albums